Glenn van Berlo (born 21 January 2002) is a Dutch racing driver from Veghel currently racing for Target Racing in the Lamborghini Super Trofeo Europe.

Career

Karting
van Berlo started karting in 2011 where he drove in the Chrono Dutch Rotax Max Challenge. Before entering single seaters van Berlo won karting titles such as the 2012 Chrono Dutch Rotax Max Challenge and the BNL Karting Series.

Spanish F4
In 2019 van Berlo stepped up to his first season in single seaters where he drove for MP Motorsport. In his first race he finished on the podium behind eventual champion Franco Colapinto and Omani Shihab Al Habsi. Throughout the season van Berlo scored 222 points along with 10 podiums and 3 wins, he fell short of the title behind Argentine Colapinto by 103 points and only missed out on second place by 5 points behind Spaniard Kilian Meyer.

Euroformula Open Championship
van Berlo was announced to drive for Drivex in mid-February He competed full time, achieving a best finish of 3rd at Spa-Francorchamps, and ended the season 9th in the standings.

Lamborghini Super Trofeo Europe
It was announced that van Berlo would switch to sportscars for 2021, sharing the Target Racing #41 car with Raul Guzman in the Lamborghini Super Trofeo Europe series.

GT World Challenge Europe
In 2023, van Berlo began competing full-time in the GT World Challenge Europe Endurance Cup. He joined co-drivers Benjamin Hites and Clemens Schmid in GRT Grasser Racing Team's #85 entry in the Silver Cup.

Racing record

Career summary

† As van Berlo was a guest driver, he was ineligible for championship points.
* Season still in progress.

Complete F4 Spanish Championship results 
(key) (Races in bold indicate pole position) (Races in italics indicate fastest lap)

Complete Euroformula Open Championship results 
(key) (Races in bold indicate pole position) (Races in italics indicate fastest lap)

Complete WeatherTech SportsCar Championship results 
(key) (Races in bold indicate pole position; races in italics indicate fastest lap)

Complete European Le Mans Series results 
(key) (Races in bold indicate pole position; results in italics indicate fastest lap)

References

External links
 

2002 births
Living people
Dutch racing drivers
Spanish F4 Championship drivers
24H Series drivers
MP Motorsport drivers
MRF Challenge Formula 2000 Championship drivers
Euroformula Open Championship drivers
European Le Mans Series drivers
International GT Open drivers
Drivex drivers
Target Racing drivers
Euronova Racing drivers
EuroInternational drivers
Karting World Championship drivers
WeatherTech SportsCar Championship drivers
Lamborghini Super Trofeo drivers
Andretti Autosport drivers